2,3-Dihydroxycinnamic acid is a hydroxycinnamic acid. It is an isomer of caffeic acid.

It is a metabolite found in human urine.

References 

Hydroxycinnamic acids
Phenolic human metabolites
Catechols
Vinylogous carboxylic acids